The Men's 110 metres hurdles at the 2014 Commonwealth Games, as part of the athletics programme, was held at Hampden Park on 29 July 2014.

Round 1
First 3 in each heat (Q) and 2 best performers (q) advance to the Final.

Heat 1

Heat 2

Heat 3

Final

References

Men's 110 metres hurdles
2014